Marai Kalam is a census town in the Sadar, Hazaribagh CD block in the Hazaribagh Sadar subdivision of  the Hazaribagh district in the Indian state of Jharkhand.

Geography

Location                         

Demographics
According to the 2011 Census of India, Marai Kalan (location code 368579) had a total population of 10,447, of which 5,402 (52%) were males and 5,045 (48%) were females. Population in the age range 0–6 years was 157. The total number of literate persons in Marai Kalan was 7,230 (81.47% of the population over 6 years).

Infrastructure
According to the District Census Handbook 2011, Hazaribagh, Marai Kalan covered an area of 2.77 km2. Among the civic amenities, it had 7 km roads with open drains, the protected water supply involved uncovered wells, hand pumps. It had 1,476 domestic electric connections, 14 road lighting points. Among the educational facilities it had 6 primary schools, 3 middle schools, the nearest secondary school, senior secondary school at Hazaribagh 4 km away.

References

Cities and towns in Hazaribagh district